Alix Renaud (30 August 1945 – 11 April 2021) was a Haitian-born Canadian writer. He was the son of Joseph M. Renaud and Béatrix Black. He was a professor of oral expression and diction, and he was the inventor of the word pompion, meaning firefighter and stemming from the French word pompier of the same meaning.

Distinctions
Lauréat du prix Charles-Biddle (2007)
 (2012)

Publications

Novels
Le Mari (1980)
Merdiland, Le Temps parallèle (1983)
Dix secondes de sursis, La liberté et Le Temps parallèle (1983)
À corps joie (1985)
Snesnob (1987)
Compère Jacques Soleil (1998)
Ovation (1999)
Grand Roi et Petit Fou (2009)
Traverses (2010)
La femme avant Ève (2011)

Linguistics
Dictionnaire de l'audiophonie (1981)
Dictionnaire anglais-français des additifs alimentaires (1990)
Pale kreyòl (1993)
Tande kreyòl la byen (1998)
Mots étrangers, mots français (2006)
Sudoku-mots (2007)

Poetry
Le Troc mystérieux (1970)
Carême (1972)
De ma fenêtre... (1974)
Exase exacte (1976)
Grâces (1976)
Dulcamara (1992)
Chair bohème (2009)

References

1945 births
2021 deaths
Canadian male novelists
Haitian writers
Haitian emigrants to Canada
People from Port-au-Prince
Canadian male poets
20th-century Canadian novelists
20th-century Canadian poets
20th-century Canadian male writers
21st-century Canadian novelists
21st-century Canadian poets
21st-century Canadian male writers
Canadian novelists in French
Canadian poets in French
Writers from Quebec
Black Canadian writers